Langekare is a small, uninhabited Baltic Sea island belonging to the country of Estonia. Its coordinates are  

Langekare is a  island lying off the eastern coast off the larger Estonian island of Hiiumaa and is administered by Pühalepa Parish, Hiiu County. Along with a number of other small islands and islets, it makes up the Hiiumaa Islets Landscape Reserve (Estonian: Hiiumaa laidude kaitseala). It is the only island of the reserve being a limestone-based island, the rest of the islands being moraine-based.  

Langekare is also part of the World Commission on Protected Areas.

See also
 List of islands of Estonia

References

External links
 Map of the Hiiumaa Islets Landscape Reserve 

Uninhabited islands of Estonia
Hiiumaa Parish
Estonian islands in the Baltic